Lyra is a Philippine television drama series broadcast by GMA Network. It stars Shaina Magdayao in the title role. It premiered on April 8, 1996. The series concluded on January 3, 1997 with a total of 200 episodes.

Cast and characters

Lead cast
 Shaina Magdayao as Lyra Monteverde

Supporting cast
 Eula Valdez as Gina Monteverde
 Lolit Solis as Marcia
 Vina Morales as Edene
 German Moreno as Kwaro
 Krista Ranillo as Shayne

Accolades

References

1996 Philippine television series debuts
1997 Philippine television series endings
Filipino-language television shows
GMA Network drama series
Television shows set in the Philippines